Ricordare Anna is a 2004 Swiss German and Italian language drama film. It was filmed and produced at locations in Sicily and in Switzerland, and is starring Bibiana Beglau and Mathias Gnädinger.

Cast
 Bibiana Beglau as Anna Looser 
 Giuseppe Cederna as Padre 
 Jean-Pierre Cornu as Professor Schweizer 
 Tina Engel as Pastor 
 Hans-Joachim Frick as Senior civil servant 
 Mathias Gnädinger as Viktor Looser 
 Urs Jucker as 
 Stefan Kollmuss as Doctor 
 Carla Mignosi as Giuseppina 
 Tanja Onorato as Daniela 
 Pippo Pollina as Salvo Marotta 
 Yves Raeber as Dr. Müller 
 Sebastian Rudolph as Frank 
 Suly Röthlisberger as Beth Looser 
 Margareta von Krauss as Olga Marotta

Plot (excerpt) 
Viktor Looser (Mathias Gnädinger) searches of forgiveness, and revisits places joint with his emotions and mistakes from the past, but instead of constantly focusing on his daughter's Anna (Bibiana Beglau) death. He finally gets in touch with her life, far away from Switzerland, in Sicily, where Anna felt drawn to in the mid 1980s after completing her degree in Italian. The spirited student left behind her involvement in the youth rebellion of the 1980s in Zürich, and, to her father's disappointment, Anna passed up the opportunity of a career at the university...

Title 
The Italian language title Ricordare Anna means Remember Anna.

Production 
Produced by Dschoint Ventschr Filmproduktion AG, Schweizer Radio und Fernsehen SRF and Radiotelevisione svizzera RSI, Ricordare Anna was filmed at locations in Switzerland and Italy. The Swiss drama film premiered at the Solothurn Film Festival on 24 January 2005. On 3 February 2005 Ricordare Anna premierred at the Swiss German cinemas, on 22 February 2006 in the French speaking area of Switzerland.

Reception 
The Swiss movie portal cineman claimed, ... and that Viktor seems also to find his love to the reconciliatory happy end, is almost overdid. However, Walo Deuber has realized a full-bodied and poignant film, which is open to top-notch in the supporting roles'''.

 Festivals 
 2005: 40. Solothurner Filmtage.  
 2005: 58. Festival internazionale del film Locarno.  
 2006: 19ème Festival International de Programmes Audiovisuels, Biarritz.

Awards
 2005: Swiss Film Prize, nomination Best Performance in a Leading Role'' (Bester Hauptdarsteller/Beste Hauptdarstellerin) for Mathias Gnädinger.

References

External links

2004 films
Swiss drama films
2000s Italian-language films
Swiss German-language films
2004 drama films
Films shot in Zürich